Rinas is a village in the county of Durrës, Albania, about 18 km northwest of the capital, Tirana. At the 2015 local government reform it became part of the municipality Krujë.

References

Populated places in Krujë
Villages in Durrës County